James Monroe Ritchie (July 28, 1829August 17, 1918) was an American lawyer and politician who served one term as a U.S. Representative from Ohio from 1881 to 1883. He was the father of Byron Foster Ritchie.

Biography 
Born in Dunfermline, Scotland, Ritchie immigrated to the United States in 1832 with his parents, who settled in St. Lawrence County, New York. His early schooling was limited and he received instruction at home from his father and mother.
He studied law.
He was admitted to the bar in 1858 and commenced practice in Toledo, Ohio.
He served as delegate to the Republican National Convention in 1880.

Congress 
Ritchie was elected as a Republican to the Forty-seventh Congress (March 4, 1881 – March 3, 1883).
He was not a candidate for renomination in 1882.

Later career and death
He again resumed the practice of his profession in Toledo, Ohio, and died there August 17, 1918.
He was interred in Grafton Cemetery, Grafton, Ohio.

Sources

1829 births
1918 deaths
Politicians from Dunfermline
Politicians from Toledo, Ohio
Ohio lawyers
British emigrants to the United States
19th-century American politicians
Lawyers from Toledo, Ohio
19th-century American lawyers
Republican Party members of the United States House of Representatives from Ohio